The  is a Japanese literary award presented biannually. Because of its prestige and the considerable attention the winner receives from the media, it is, along with the Naoki Prize, one of Japan's most sought after literary prizes.

History

The Akutagawa Prize was established in 1935 by Kan Kikuchi, then-editor of Bungeishunjū magazine, in memory of author Ryūnosuke Akutagawa. It is currently sponsored by the Society for the Promotion of Japanese Literature, and is awarded in January and July to the best serious literary story published in a newspaper or magazine by a new or rising author. The winner receives a pocket watch and a cash award of 1 million yen.  The judges usually include contemporary writers, literary critics, and former winners of the prize. Occasionally, when consensus cannot be reached between judges over disputes about the winning story or the quality of work for that half year, no prize is awarded. From 1945 through 1948 no prizes were awarded due to postwar instability. The prize has frequently been split between two authors.

On January 15, 2004, the awarding of the 130th Akutagawa Prize made significant news when two women became the award's youngest winners. The prize went to both Risa Wataya, 19, for her novel  and to Hitomi Kanehara, 20, for her debut novel . Previously the youngest Akutagawa winners were all males over 23 years old, among them the former Tokyo Governor Shintaro Ishihara and novelist Kenzaburō Ōe. In 2013 Natsuko Kuroda won the 148th Akutagawa Prize at age 75, making her the oldest recipient in the history of the prize.

Controversies
In 1972, Akutagawa winner  was found to have committed plagiarism. In 2018, a similar controversy occurred when the candidate novel  by Yuko Hojo was found to have reused text from its nonfiction source material without attribution, but the Society for the Promotion of Japanese Literature did not remove the book from the candidate list.

Winners
Bungeishunjū maintains an official archive of current and past winners on behalf of the Society for the Promotion of Japanese Literature.

Current members of the selection committee and year appointed
Amy Yamada, 2003
Hiromi Kawakami, 2007
Yōko Ogawa, 2007
Masahiko Shimada, 2010
Toshiyuki Horie, 2012
Hikaru Okuizumi, 2012
Shuichi Yoshida, 2016
Hisaki Matsuura, 2019
Keiichiro Hirano, 2020

See also
 List of Japanese literary awards

References

 
1935 establishments in Japan
Awards established in 1935
Japanese-language literary awards
Japanese literary awards
Ryūnosuke Akutagawa